Hassan Bashir (born 7 January 1987) is a Pakistani footballer who plays for Ishøj IF and captains the Pakistan national team. Bashir has played much of his career as a forward, but has been deployed in a variety of attacking roles – as an offensive midfielder, second striker and centre forward.

Personal life 
Hassan Bashir was born in Copenhagen, Denmark to a Pakistani family. Hassan is the second youngest of 8 siblings. 
Hassan is married and is the father of 3 kids.

Club career 

Bashir made his senior football debut for FC Nordsjælland (Farum BK) reserves in 2006. Later on he joined the 1st team Squad in FC Nordsjalland (Farum BK), for whom he made 1 appearance in the Superliga in 2007 at the age of 20.

He spent 1 season in FC Norsjælland, before moving to Køge BK in the 2007 summer transfer window. Ever since then, he has played for several clubs like Fremad Amager, Hellerup IK and Fyn in the lower divisions of Denmark - the last being Svebølle B&I where he joined fellow national team players, Yousuf Butt and Nabil Aslam. Bashir also had a short stint at Thai Premier League with BBCU for the 2012 season.

In July 2018, Hassan Bashir joined AB Tårnby. In August 2018, he made his debut against Karlslunde where he scored a goal. Later on he was joined by Pakistan national team fellow Yousuf Butt. In June 2020, when AB Tårnby defeated Karlslunde in the second promotion match, AB Tårnby promoted to Danish 2nd Division.

Bashir moved to fourth-tier Denmark Series club Ishøj IF on 18 March 2021.

International

Bashir has earned 21 caps for the national team since his debut in a friendly match against Singapore in 2012. He scored his first goal in a 1–0 victory over Nepal and later provided the assist for Muhammad Mujahid's winning goal in the second friendly game against Nepal. In 2015, Bashir was appointed captain of the national team for the two-match friendly series against Afghanistan. On February 6, 2015 Bashir provided two assists in the first friendly against Afghanistan as Pakistan won the match 2–1. On March 12, 2015 Bashir scored his first goal in FIFA World Cup 2018 qualifiers against Yemen in the first leg from the penalty spot as Pakistan lost the match by 3-1. It was Pakistan's first ever goal in World Cup qualifiers.

2018 SAFF CUP

On September 4, 2018, Bashir scored Pakistan's first international goal from the penalty spot when his national side returned to international circuit after 3 years against Nepal in a 2 - 1 win. He also had scored country's last goal 3 years back against Yemen which was also from the penalty spot. On September 8, 2018, Bashir scored the opener against Bhutan in a 3 - 0 win which was Pakistan's last game of the group stage and Pakistan sealed its place is semi finals.

On November 16, 2018, Bashir scored another goal for Pakistan against Palestine in a 2 - 1 loss.

International appearances

International goals

Scores and results table list Pakistan's goal tally first.

References

External links

 
 
 

1987 births
Living people
Footballers from Copenhagen
Pakistani footballers
Pakistani expatriate footballers
Association football forwards
Pakistan international footballers
Fremad Amager players
Danish people of Pakistani descent
Expatriate footballers in Kyrgyzstan
FC Dordoi Bishkek players
Pakistani expatriate sportspeople in Kyrgyzstan
FC Nordsjælland players
Køge Boldklub players
Brønshøj Boldklub players
FC Fyn players
Hellerup IK players
Hassan Bashir
BK Søllerød-Vedbæk players
Hassan Bashir
Danish 2nd Division players
Danish 1st Division players
Holbæk B&I players
AB Tårnby players
Denmark Series players
Ishøj IF players
Expatriate footballers in Thailand
Danish expatriate sportspeople in Thailand
Danish expatriate sportspeople in Kyrgyzstan
Danish men's footballers
Pakistani expatriate sportspeople in Thailand